Roland Wilbur Brown (1893–1961) was an American paleobotanist and geologist.

Biography
Brown was born in 1893. In 1928, he was appointed as a geologist with the United States Geological Survey, where he remained until he retired in 1958. He also served as a Research Associate in the Department of Geology of the United States National Museum, starting from 1951 util his death in 1961. He studied Cenozoic and Mesozoic plants from western North America.

Roland Brown also was a linguistic scholar, and is widely known among taxonomists for his book, "Composition of Scientific Words", originally published in 1927 under the title "Materials for Word-Study" and reprinted in 1954, 1965, 1978, and 1985 under the latter title. It provided a large number of taxonomists in the Twentieth Century with the ability to coin new names of taxa (species, genera, families, etc.), facilitating the conservation of the world's biodiversity.

References

Paleobotanists
1893 births
1961 deaths